Henry Kalungi (born November 25, 1987 in Kampala) is a Ugandan footballer.

Career

College and amateur
Kalungi moved from his native Uganda to the United States in 2006 to attend and play college soccer at Winthrop University. He made 56 appearances for Winthrop in his three years at the college, was named the 2006 team MVP, and received Big South All-Tournament Team and NSCAA/adidas All-South Atlantic Region Team accolades.

Kalungi also played with the Hampton Roads Piranhas and the Fredericksburg Gunners in the USL Premier Development League, being named to the All-Conference First-Team in 2008.

Professional
Kalungi was drafted in the fourth round (53rd overall) of the 2009 MLS SuperDraft by Colorado Rapids, but was not offered a contract by the team. He later signed with the Richmond Kickers of the USL Second Division, and made his professional debut on April 18, 2009 in Richmond's 2-2 opening day tie with the Harrisburg City Islanders. He remained with Richmond through the 2009, 2010, and 2011 seasons. The club re-signed him for the 2012 season on September 22, 2011.

Kalungi was loaned to Proline FC of the Ugandan Super League on October 3, 2011. He will return to Richmond in February 2012. He was recently signed by Charlotte Independence.

International
Kalungi has appeared for the Ugandan U-20 national team and the senior national team.

Honors

Richmond Kickers
USL Second Division Champions (1): 2009
USL Pro Commissioner's Cup (1): 2013

References

External links
 
 
 
 

1987 births
Living people
Ugandan footballers
Ugandan expatriate footballers
Uganda international footballers
Winthrop Eagles men's soccer players
Virginia Beach Piranhas players
Fredericksburg Gunners players
Richmond Kickers players
North Carolina FC players
Charlotte Independence players
Expatriate soccer players in the United States
Ugandan expatriate sportspeople in the United States
USL League Two players
USL Second Division players
USL Championship players
North American Soccer League players
Colorado Rapids draft picks
Association football defenders
Sportspeople from Kampala